Curtis W. Marean is a professor of archaeology at Arizona State University.

In a 2010 article in Scientific American, Marean explained how anatomically modern humans survived the MIS 6 glacial stage 195-123 thousand years ago, a period during which the human population was limited to only a few hundreds breeding individuals.  During this period, sea levels dropped more than a hundred meters and the sloping South African Agulhas Bank was transformed into a plain on which humans could survive on shellfish and wash-ups from the sea.

He is currently the associate director of the Institute of Human Origins in Tempe, Arizona.

See also
 Pinnacle Point

References

External links
 

American archaeologists
Year of birth missing (living people)
Living people